Joseph Ndunguru is a Molecular Plant Virologist, working for the Ministry of Agriculture, Livestock and Fisheries in Tanzania at Mikocheni Agricultural Research Institute (MARI), as the Officer in Charge from 2012 to date. He is also the National Biotechnology Research Coordinator in Tanzania.

His research interest is to understand plant viruses at the molecular level, develop diagnostic tools, and develop management strategies for plant viruses of economically important crops in Africa.

References 

Year of birth missing (living people)
Living people
Tanzanian virologists
Tanzanian phytopathologists
Sokoine University of Agriculture alumni
University of Zambia alumni
University of Pretoria alumni